is a passenger railway station located in the town of Miyashiro, Saitama, Japan, operated by the private railway operator Tōbu Railway.

Line

Station layout
The station has two opposed side platforms serving two tracks, with an elevated station building located above the tracks and platform.

Platforms

Adjacent stations

History
Himemiya Station opened on 1 September 1927.

From 17 March 2012, station numbering was introduced on all Tōbu lines, with Himemiya Station becoming "TS-29".

Passenger statistics
In fiscal 2019, the station was used by an average of 5215 passengers daily.

Surrounding area
 Miyashiro High School
 Miyashiro Himemiya Post Office
 Himemiya Shrine

See also
 List of railway stations in Japan

References

External links

 Tobu station information 

Railway stations in Japan opened in 1927
Tobu Skytree Line
Stations of Tobu Railway
Railway stations in Saitama Prefecture
Miyashiro, Saitama